Samurai Jack: The Amulet of Time is an action video game developed by British studio Virtucraft and published by BAM! Entertainment for the Game Boy Advance. Based on the animated series Samurai Jack, the game came about after a licensing agreement deal was reached between Cartoon Network and BAM! Entertainment in January 2002. It was released worldwide on March 25, 2003.

Gameplay
The game follows Jack's quest through seven areas to obtain the elemental gem pieces of an amulet that can send him back to his own time. As more gemstones are collected, the player unlocks more of Jack's weapons and abilities, such as a super jump and a battle hammer.

Reception

The game received "mixed" reviews according to the review aggregation website Metacritic. IGN's Craig Harris cited the game's similarities to Metroid and recent Castlevania games as good design, but said the game lacked originality.

References

External links
 

2003 video games
Video games based on Samurai Jack
Game Boy Advance games
Game Boy Advance-only games
Video games about samurai
Video games based on animated television series
Metroidvania games
Video games developed in the United Kingdom
Cartoon Network video games